The Early Cape houses of Wells, Maine, are a collection of 18th-century Cape style houses in or near the town of Wells, Maine.  The town has a concentration of these houses that is unusual in the state of Maine.   In the 1970s the town conducted a detailed street survey, in which 19 historically significant 18th-century Cape houses were identified either in or just outside the municipal boundaries.  These buildings were subsequently listed on the National Register of Historic Places in December 1979.

Background
The town of Wells, Maine is located in York County on the coast of southern Maine. This lack of significant harbor facilities would play a role in the town's development. Wells was settled in the 1640s, and was from its earliest days a primarily agrarian settlement, while neighboring York and Kennebunkport developed economically around fishing, lumber, and seagoing merchant activity. The entire southern Maine area, with only a small population, was devastated in repeated conflicts between the British colonies of New England and New France, and was effectively abandoned after repeated raids involving the French and their Native American allies in the late 17th and early 18th centuries. As a result, there are very few buildings in the region that predate 1710.

As the area was resettled in the 18th century, Wells again developed only slowly, because of its lack of harbor facilities, and remained an agricultural area with a low population density.  This rural setting allowed a larger number of these older humble farmsteads to survive.  The buildings listed here are typified by having a main block that is a wood-frame structure  stories in height, with a front facade five bays wide and a side-gable roof.  There is usually a large central chimney, and the main entrance is located in the center of the front facade.  Decorative elements are generally modest, and the doors and windows are often set with their tops just below the eaves, a feature not generally found in later versions of the same style house.  Additions typically extend the house to the side or rear, and range in age from the 18th to the 20th century.

Listed buildings
The nineteen historically significant Capes are briefly described below.  Each was listed on the National Register of Historic Places on December 27, 1979, although some of them are formally listed as being the vicinity of one of Wells' neighboring towns, or a neighborhood of Wells, rather than in Wells itself.  All but four are actually within the municipal bounds of Wells; the others are in Ogunquit.

See also
National Register of Historic Places listings in York County, Maine
List of the oldest buildings in Maine

References

Houses on the National Register of Historic Places in Maine
Wells, Maine
Buildings and structures in Ogunquit, Maine
Houses in York County, Maine
National Register of Historic Places in York County, Maine